Douglas Consiglio (born 10 January 1964) is a Canadian middle-distance runner. He competed in the men's 1500 metres at the 1988 Summer Olympics.

References

1964 births
Living people
Athletes (track and field) at the 1988 Summer Olympics
Canadian male middle-distance runners
Olympic track and field athletes of Canada
Athletes from Toronto